"4 to 1 in Atlanta" is a song written by Bill Kenner and L. Russell Brown, and recorded by American country music artist Tracy Byrd. It was released in May 1996 as the fourth and final single from the 1995 album Love Lessons. The song reached No. 21 on the Billboard Hot Country Singles & Tracks chart.

Chart performance

References

Atlanta in fiction
1995 songs
1996 singles
Tracy Byrd songs
Song recordings produced by Tony Brown (record producer)
Songs written by Bill Kenner
Songs written by L. Russell Brown
MCA Records singles